"Life in Technicolor II" (stylised as "Life in Technicolor ii") is a song by British rock band Coldplay released as the first single from the Prospekt's March EP. It is the full-vocal version of the instrumental track "Life in Technicolor", from the band's fourth studio album, Viva la Vida or Death and All His Friends. The songs starts with a loop consisting of a santoor accompanied by tabla-like percussion. The loop is then repeated through the verses and part of the chorus.

A promotional CD single was released in December 2008 while the 7-inch vinyl and digital download came out on 2 February 2009. While the promotional CD includes two different edits of the song ("Radio edit" & "Prospekt's March Version"), the vinyl includes a previously unreleased and unheard track called "The Goldrush", one of the few Coldplay songs featuring lead vocals by drummer Will Champion. The track was nominated for Best Rock Performance by a Duo or Group with Vocal and Best Music Video at the 52nd Annual Grammy Awards.

Music video

The music video premiered on 20 January 2009 on 4Music and Channel 4. The director of this video is Dougal Wilson. It starts out with a group of children sitting and awaiting a traditional Punch and Judy puppet show in the Aldenham War Memorial Hall. Suddenly, the band appears as puppets "onstage" and begins performing the song, which confuses and somewhat unsettles the children and the adults in the room. A girl in the audience recognizes the band members as she looks back and forth between them and the cover of a book she is holding, which is a fictional "unofficial biography" of Coldplay called Playin' It Cool. The puppet show becomes increasingly extravagant as the video goes on, eventually featuring pyrotechnics, frontman Chris Martin crowd surfing over the children, and Punch and Judy performing motorcycle stunts across the stage. Finally, after finishing the song, the puppet band members board a miniature helicopter and after taking off, drummer Will Champion tosses his drumsticks to the girl in the audience before the helicopter crashes through a window as they fly away. The girl looks down at the tiny drumsticks in her hands and smiles. James Clarkson and Coldplay's fifth member, Phil Harvey, can be seen in the video.

Reception 
The video was nominated for Best Art Direction in a Video and Best Visual Effects in a Video categories at the UK Music Video Awards 2009, and for Best Music Video at the 52nd Annual Grammy Awards. Pitchfork included the track on their unranked "Top Music Videos of 2009" list.

In popular culture
The short instrumental version of this song (released on Viva la Vida) can be heard as the film Night at the Museum: Battle of the Smithsonian ends during a scene with Ben Stiller and Amy Adams.  It was also used on Sky Sports' "Ford Super Sunday" coverage during the 2008/2009 as well as "Match of the Day" during the same season. This version was used at the beginning of the Great Yarmouth (UK) Hippodrome Circus show 2009. NFL Network also used it for their coverage of the 2009 NFL Scouting Combine and also for their coverage of the 2009 NFL Draft.
The song was also played during the opening montage of the 2009 ESPY Awards. The instrumental version of the song is used in London Eye's pre-flight 4D Experience show. A portion of the instrumental version is also used in Apple Inc.'s introduction of the 2008 MacBook Air, as well as the introduction of the Late 08 MacBook. The song was also used in a promotional on Public Broadcasting Service (PBS) for PBS's primary programming. Life in Technicolor II was used in an advertisement for Wimbledon 2013 on ESPN.

Track listing

Personnel
 Chris Martin – lead vocals, piano, keyboards, acoustic guitar
 Guy Berryman – bass guitar, santoor, backing vocals
 Jonny Buckland – electric guitar
 Will Champion – drums, percussion, backing vocals
 Jon Hopkins – organ, harmonium, synthesizers
 Mike Kezner – sitar
 Davide Rossi – strings

Charts

Weekly charts

Year-end charts

Release history

References

External links 

Coldplay songs
2009 singles
2008 songs
Music videos featuring puppetry
Parlophone singles
Song recordings produced by Brian Eno
Song recordings produced by Jon Hopkins
Song recordings produced by Markus Dravs
Song recordings produced by Rik Simpson
Songs written by Guy Berryman
Songs written by Jonny Buckland
Songs written by Will Champion
Songs written by Chris Martin